The Familia Caritatis, also known as the Familists, was a mystical religious sect founded in the sixteenth century by Henry Nicholis, also known as Niclaes. Familia Caritatis translates from Latin into "Family of Love", and in other languages, "Hus der Lieften", "Huis der Liefde" and "Haus der Liebe".

History
The outward trappings of Nicholis's system were Anabaptist. His followers were said to assert that all things were ruled by nature and not directly by God, of denying the dogma of the Trinity, and repudiating infant baptism. They held that no man should be put to death for his opinions, and apparently, like the later Quakers, they objected to the carrying of arms and to anything like an oath; and they were quite impartial in their repudiation of all other churches and sects, including Brownists and Barrowists.

Nicholis's message is said to have appealed to the well educated and creative elite, artists, musicians and scholars. They felt no need to spread the message and risk prosecution for heresy; members were usually a part of an otherwise established church, quietly remaining in the background, confident in their elite status as part of the Godhead. The Encyclopædia Britannica Eleventh Edition states:

Members of the Familists included cartographer Abraham Ortelius and publisher Christopher Plantin. Plantin worked by day as Philip II of Spain's printer of Catholic documents for the Counter Reformation, and otherwise surreptitiously printed Familist literature.

Nicholis's chief apostle in England was Christopher Vitell who led the largest group of Familists in Balsham, Cambridgeshire. In October 1580 Roger Goad, Dr Bridgewater and William Fulke engaged in the examination of John Bourne, a glover and some others of the Family of Love who were confined in Wisbech Castle, in the Isle of Ely. In the 1580s, it was discovered that some of the Yeomen of the Guard for Elizabeth I were Familists; the Queen did nothing about it, which raised questions about her own beliefs. The keeper of the lions in the Tower of London for James I was a Familist.

The society lingered into the early years of the eighteenth century; the leading idea of its service of love was a reliance on sympathy and tenderness for the moral and spiritual edification of its members. Thus, in an age of strife and polemics, it seemed to afford a refuge for quiet, gentle spirits, and meditative temperaments. The Quakers, Baptists and Unitarians may have derived some of their ideas from the "Family".

References

Further reading
 A.J. van der Aa, "Hendrik Niclaes", in Biographisch Woordenboek der Nederlanden Vol. XIII (J.J. van Brederode, Haarlem 1868) dbnl online 
 J.G. Ebel, "The Family of Love: Sources of Its History in England", Huntington Library Quarterly, Vol. XXX no 4 (August 1967), pp. 331–343 Jstor
 
 Alastair Hamilton: The Family of Love. Cambridge 1981
 Christopher Hill: Milton and the English Revolution. London: Faber (1977)
 W.N. Kerr: Henry Nicholis and the Familists. Unpublished dissertation.  Edinburgh 1955
 M. Konnert, "The Family of Love and the Church of England", Renaissance and Reformation Vol 27 no. 3 (1991) (New Series Vol. 15 no 2), pp. 139–172. ISSN 0034-429X: 
 ---- Loafs, "Familisten", in Schaff-Herzog Encyclopedia of Religious Knowledge (1898)
 C. Marsh, "A Gracelesse, and Audacious Companie? The Family of Love in the parish of Balsham, 1550–1630", Studies in Church History (Ecclesiastical History Society), Vol. 23: Voluntary Religion (1986), pp. 191–208
 Christopher Marsh: "An Introduction to the Family of Love in England", in E.S. Leedham-Green: Religious Dissent in East Anglia. Cambridge 1991, pp. 29–36 
 C.W. Marsh: The Family of Love in English Society, 1550-1630 (Cambridge University Press 1994), (Google)
 F. Nippold, "H. Niclaes und das Haus der Liebe", in Zeitschrift für die historische Theologie (1862), pp. 323-394 (bsb-muenchen)
 N.A. Penrhys-Evans: The Family of Love in England, 1550–1650. Unpublished Dissertation, University of Kent (Canterbury 1971)
 Charles Wehrenberg, Before New York, Solo Zone, San Francisco 1995/2001,

External links 
 Family of Love, from ExLibris. Contains extended bibliography. (Updated link)
 Familist, from Encyclopædia Britannica, on-line edition, free.
 Global Anabaptist Mennonite Encyclopedia Online: Family of Love

Religious organizations established in the 1530s
16th-century Christianity
Former Christian denominations
Christian radicalism
Nontrinitarian denominations